Laura Maria Nunnink (born 26 January 1995) is a Dutch field hockey player for the Dutch national team.

She participated at the 2018 Women's Hockey World Cup.

References

External links
 

1995 births
Living people
Dutch female field hockey players
Female field hockey midfielders
HC Oranje-Rood players
HC Den Bosch players
Field hockey players at the 2020 Summer Olympics
Olympic field hockey players of the Netherlands
Place of birth missing (living people)
Olympic gold medalists for the Netherlands
Medalists at the 2020 Summer Olympics
Olympic medalists in field hockey
20th-century Dutch women
21st-century Dutch women